Zunyi is a prefecture-level city in northern Guizhou province, People's Republic of China, situated between the provincial capital Guiyang to the south and Chongqing to the north, also bordering Sichuan to the northwest. Along with Guiyang and Liupanshui, it is one of the most important cities of the province. The metro area is made of three urban districts of the city, Huichuan, Honghuagang, and Bozhou, had a population of 2,360,549 people; and the whole prefecture, including 14 county-level administration area as a whole, had a population of 6,606,675 at the 2020 census.

Zunyi is known for being the location  of the Zunyi Conference in 1935, where Mao Zedong was first elected to the leadership of the Chinese Communist Party during the Long March.

History 

The area of Zunyi was originally inhabited by the Tongzi people during the Paleolithic. Later, its territory was a part of several kingdoms. Zunyi was considered to be the center of the Yelang kingdom. The region around Zunyi first came under Chinese rule during Han dynasty, during the reign of Emperor Wu of Han. After the Han dynasty collapsed, the area remained under nominal Chinese control, but much of the administration was left to local, non-Han chiefs. In the 7th century CE, the area came under regular Chinese administration during the Tang dynasty, Zunyi was placed under the new Bo Prefecture (Bozhou).

Towards the end of the Tang, Bozhou was conquered by the Nanzhao Kingdom. However, it soon gained independence as the Chiefdom of Bozhou in AD 876. The chiefdom became an autonomous prefecture of the Song and subsequent dynasties, while the ruling Yang family held power in Zunyi for more than seven centuries. Bozhou rebelled against the Ming dynasty in 1589, resisting the Ming for more than a decade before its eventual destruction in 1600. Subsequently, Zunyi Prefecture was established, with the present-day city of Zunyi becoming the prefectural seat. Zunyi retained its status as a prefectural seat through the Qing dynasty. After the Xinhai Revolution, Zunyi was redesignated as a county in 1914.

In 1935, the Zunyi Conference took place in the city, resulting in Mao Zedong becoming the de facto leader of the Chinese Communist Party.

During the country's the First Five-Year Plan, Zunyi was redesignated as a city, and experienced considerable growth and transformation.

Geography and climate

Zunyi has a four-season, monsoon-influenced humid subtropical climate (Köppen Cfa), slightly modified by elevation. It has fairly mild winters and hot, humid summers; close to 60% of the year's  of precipitation occurs from May to August. Rain is common throughout the year, with 182 days annually precipitation, though it does not actually accumulate to much in winter, the cloudiest time of year; summer, in contrast, is the sunniest. With monthly percent possible sunshine ranging from around 9% in January and February to 45% in August, the city receives only 1,051 hours of bright sunshine annually; only a few locations in neighbouring Sichuan receive less sunshine on average.

Administration

Ethnic groups 
The 1999 Zunyi Prefecture Almanac lists the following ethnic groups.
Gelao
Miao
 ("Blue-Skirted Miao"): most populous, found in western Zunyi Prefecture
 ("Red-Skirted Miao"): central Zunyi Prefecture
 ("White-Skirted Miao"): least populous, found in central Zunyi Prefecture
 ("Chinese Miao"; clothing similar to that of the ): northwestern Zunyi Prefecture
Tujia
Buyi
Yi
Dong
Hui
Manchu

Transportation 
China National Highway 210
China National Highway 306
Sichuan–Guizhou Railway
Chongqing–Guiyang high-speed railway
Zunyi Xinzhou Airport 
G4215 Rongzun Expressway
G56 Hangzhou–Ruili Expressway
G75 Lanzhou-Haikou Expressway

A rapid transit system is in the planning stages for Zunyi.

Economy 
Zunyi is the economic and commercial hub of the North Guizhou Province. In 2019, Zunyi's GDP was CN¥348.3 billion (US$53 billion).

Culture 
Being known as the "home of culture" of Guizhou province, Zunyi, or the North-Guizhou area, is the education and economic centre of the province.

Museums & tourism
The Zunyi Conference Memorial Museum is located in Honghuagang District, and consists of several sites related to the historical Zunyi Conference.

Institutions of higher learning
Zunyi is home to the Zunyi Medical College (ZMC), which was formerly the Dalian Medical College founded in 1947. The college was moved from Dalian to Zunyi and renamed to the Zunyi Medical College with the approval of the State Council in 1969. Another college-level institution of in the city is the Zunyi Normal College.

Food and liquor
The rice liquor Maotai is produced in the town of Maotai, known as the "national liquor of China." Zunyi is home to much chili pepper cultivation, and red sorghum is also grown in Zunyi, a key ingredient for baijiu in China.

References

External links

Official website

 
Cities in Guizhou
Prefecture-level divisions of Guizhou
National Forest Cities in China